This article contains information about the literary events and publications of 1530.

Events
January – The first printed translation of the Torah into English, by William Tyndale, is published in Antwerp for distribution in Britain.
May – The Tyndale Bible is publicly burned in England as heretical.
unknown dates
 First complete edition of the 'Zürich Bible', Huldrych Zwingli's translation into German printed by Christoph Froschauer, is published.
An edition of Desiderius Erasmus's Paraphrasis in Elegantiarum Libros Laurentii Vallae is the first book to use the Roman form of the Garamond typeface cut by Claude Garamond.
Paracelsus finishes writing Paragranum and leaves Nuremberg.
This is the earliest likely date for first printing of the Middle English tail-rhyme chivalric romance Sir Isumbras and of Sir Lamwell.

New books

Prose
Otto Brunfels –  (third part: 1536)
Erasmus – A handbook on manners for children (De Civilitate Morum Puerilium Libellus)
William Tyndale – The Practice of Prelates

Drama
Henry Medwall – Nature (first printing)
John Heywood – The Play called the foure PP; a newe and a very mery interlude of a palmer, a pardoner, a potycary, a pedler

Poetry

Pietro Bembo – Rime
Girolamo Fracastoro – Syphilis sive morbus gallicus
Hans Sachs – Das Schlaraffenland

Births
July 3 – Claude Fauchet, French historian (died 1601)
August 2 – Girolamo Mercuriale, Italian physician and philologist (died 1606)
November 1 – Étienne de La Boétie, French judge, philosopher and essayist (died 1563)
Unknown dates
Jerónimo Bermúdez, Spanish playwright and poet (died 1599)
Jean Bodin, French political philosopher (died 1596)
François de Belleforest, French poet and translator (died 1582)
Pey de Garros, Occitan poet writing in Gascon (died 1585)
Baltasar del Alcázar, Spanish poet (died 1606)
Thomas Hoby, English diplomat and translator (died 1566)
Jan Kochanowski, Polish poet also writing in Latin (died 1584)
William Stevenson, English clergyman and presumed playwright (died 1575)
Approximate years
Judah Moscato, Italian rabbi, poet and philosopher (died 1593)
Richard Tarlton, English actor (died 1588)

Deaths
April 27 (one source states August 6) – Jacopo Sannazaro, Neapolitan poet, humanist and epigrammist also writing in Latin (born 1458)
April 28 – Niklaus Manuel, Swiss playwright writing in German and artist (born 1484)
August 28 – Gerold Edlibach, Swiss chronicler (born 1454)
December 22 – Willibald Pirckheimer, German humanist writer (born 1470)
Unknown date – Molla, Indian poet writing in Telugu, translator of the Ramayana (born 1440)
probable – Juan del Encina, Spanish poet, musician and playwright (born 1468)

References

Literature

1530 books
Renaissance literature
Early Modern literature
Years of the 16th century in literature